Artakovo is a rural locality (a settlement at the railway station) in Selektsionny Selsoviet Rural Settlement, Lgovsky District, Kursk Oblast, Russia. Population:

Geography 
The settlement is located 45 km from the Russia–Ukraine border, 70 km south-west of Kursk, 5 km south-west of the district center – the town Lgov, 2 km from the selsoviet center – Selektsionny.

 Climate
Artakovo has a warm-summer humid continental climate (Dfb in the Köppen climate classification).

Transport 
Artakovo is located 0.5 km from the road of regional importance  (Kursk – Lgov – Rylsk – border with Ukraine) as part of the European route E38, 2.5 km from the road of intermunicipal significance  (38K-017 – Arsenyevka – Kochanovka – the railway halt 387 km), next to the railway station Artakowo (railway line 322 km – Lgov I).

The rural locality is situated 76.5 km from Kursk Vostochny Airport, 145 km from Belgorod International Airport and 279 km from Voronezh Peter the Great Airport.

References

Notes

Sources

Rural localities in Lgovsky District